Bozghaleh (also Romanized as Bozghāleh; also known as Boz Qal‘eh) is a village in Chaldoran-e Shomali Rural District, in the Central District of Chaldoran County, West Azerbaijan Province, Iran. At the 2006 census, its population was 116, in 22 families.

References 

Populated places in Chaldoran County